1997 Verdy Kawasaki season

Review and events

Competitions

Domestic results

J.League

Emperor's Cup

J.League Cup

Super Cup

International results

Asian Cup Winners' Cup

Player statistics

 † player(s) joined the team after the opening of this season.

Transfers

In:

Out:

Transfers during the season

In
Kenji Honnami (from Gamba Osaka)
Carlos Alberto Costa Dias (on June)
Alcindo Sartori (on August)
Ruy Ramos (from Kyoto Purple Sanga)
Nobuyuki Zaizen (return)

Out
Toshimi Kikuchi (to Gamba Osaka)
Takanori Nunobe (to Júbilo Iwata)
Nobuhiro Takeda (to JEF United Ichihara)
Keiji Ishizuka (to Consadole Sapporo)
Shigetoshi Hasebe (to Kawasaki Frontale)

Awards
none

References
J.LEAGUE OFFICIAL GUIDE 1997, 1997 
J.LEAGUE OFFICIAL GUIDE 1998, 1996 
J.LEAGUE YEARBOOK 1999, 1999

Other pages
 J. League official site
 Tokyo Verdy official site

Verdy Kawasaki
Tokyo Verdy seasons